Cinta Laura Kiehl (born August 17, 1993) is a German actress, singer, and model based in Indonesia.

She was appointed ambassador of anti-violence against women and children by the Indonesian Ministry of Women Empowerment and Child Protection in 2019.

Early life and education 
Laura grew up in several countries such as the UAE, Saudi Arabia, Malaysia, Singapore, Germany and Indonesia. Upon her move to Indonesia at 12 years old, Laura became an Indonesian national swimmer, winning 10 gold medals, 7 silver medals and 7 bronze medals from various swimming competitions.

Laura studied at Columbia University in New York. She was a teaching assistant (TA) for Professor Herbert S. Terrace in Columbia's psychology department. While at Columbia, she joined the sorority Kappa Alpha Theta. Laura graduated cum laude from the university in May 2014. After graduating, she moved to Los Angeles to pursue her acting career in Hollywood, signing her contract under Netflix and Grindstone Entertainment Group.

Career

2007: Debut
Laura started her career in February 2007, debuted under MD Entertainment. Her first soap opera, Cinderella: Apakah Cinta Hanyalah Mimpi? aired on SCTV and TV2 (Malaysia) with 310 episodes, where she gain popularity and won ”2007 Indonesia's Best Actress” on 2007 SCTV Awards.

2007−2012: Oh Baby, Cinta Laura album, and Hollywood Dreams

In 2007, Laura playing her first movie Oh Baby, where she also taking part on the film soundtrack, Oh Baby reigned in the no. 1 position of various charts in Indonesia, Malaysia and Brunei Darussalam. Soon after that, she released her first self-titled studio album, Cinta Laura (2010). The album was released in February 2010 and sold over a million copies. In the summer of 2010, Cinta received the Wannabe Artist Award of 2010 Nickelodeon Indonesia Kids' Choice Awards.

She also filming her TV soap series, Upik Abu dan Laura (2008) and Air Mata Cinta (2009), which was a success in Indonesia and Malaysia aired in RCTI and TV3 (Malaysia). Following her success, she released several songs You Say Aq, Guardian Angel, Cinta Atau Uang, Tulalit, Boomerang and Playlist for her second album Hollywood Dreams (2012).

2013−present: International acting career and English album
In 2013, she decided to move to Los Angeles. In addition, Laura was offered to act in a Hollywood-produced movie After the Dark (2013), starring Bonnie Wright and James D’Arcy. Laura work together with Grindstone Entertainment Group, continuing her acting at The Ninth Passenger (2018) by Hollywood producer Corey Large. She has also appeared on several Netflix Lifetime films, such as Crazy For The Boys (2018), TAR (2018), Goodnight (2018) and The Nanny Is Watching (2018). Laura won a "Best Film Actress" at the "2019 Latino Film awards", for the movie Goodnight (2018).

In 2019, Laura came back with her new English single Caliente and Vida after 7 years hiatus. She also starred in several Indonesian films such as Target (2018), MatiAnak (2019) and Jeritan Malam (2019).

Filmography

Film

Television

Variety show

Discography

Studio albums

Featured singles

Awards and nomination

References

External links

Official Site

Living people
Columbia University alumni
Columbia College (New York) alumni
Columbia University Vagelos College of Physicians and Surgeons alumni
Columbia Lions women's swimmers
Teachers College, Columbia University alumni
Indo people
Sundanese people
People from Jakarta
Indonesian Muslims
Indonesian female swimmers
Indonesian child singers
Indonesian dance musicians
Indonesian expatriates in the United States
Indonesian female models
21st-century Indonesian women singers
Indonesian film actresses
German people of Indonesian descent 
Indonesian people of German descent
Indonesian stage actresses
Indonesian television actresses
21st-century Indonesian actresses
Anugerah Musik Indonesia winners
1993 births